Pajdushko oro is a folk dance from Bulgaria, Greece and North Macedonia. It features a 5-beat meter divided into "quick" (2-beat) and "slow" (3-beat) units, abbreviated quick-slow or 2+3. In Bulgaria it is part of the "Northern folklore region" time . Like many other Balkan folk dances, each region or village has its own version of the dance. It is traditionally a men's dance, but in modern times it is often performed in lines of both men and women.

It is a line dance, with the dancers in a line facing left, holding hands. The dance starts moving right with a series of four lift-steps, followed by moving left: crossing the right foot in front of the left, transferring the weight onto the right foot while moving the left foot to the right (this is the characteristic movement of this dance, and is done four times). The dancers next move backwards using a series of four lift-steps.

A number of variations can be seen among individual dancers. For example, instead of moving left with the right foot always crossing in front, a front and back pattern can be used, resulting in a basic grapevine step. When moving backwards, the lift steps can be replaced by scissor-steps, often ending with a pas-de-basque step.

A common version of this dance is Jambolsko Pajdushko oro (yahm-bohl-sko pie-doosh-ko).

The dance is known as the "Drunken Dance" (Macedonian: пијано оро)  in North Macedonia and is believed to have been brought to Turkey hundreds of years ago within the early stages of the Ottoman rule of Macedonia. The Pajdusko is still danced by many within Turkey, especially Turks of Macedonian ancestry.

See also
Macedonian dances
Bulgarian dances
International folk dance

References

External links
Pajdusko(Balkan Guzeli)
Pajdusko(Balkan Guzeli)Turkish lyrics

Greek dances
Bulgarian dances
Macedonian dances